Zotsara Randriambololona (born 22 April 1994), also known as Zout, is a professional footballer who plays for Moldovan club Bălți, as a right winger. Born in France, he represents Madagascar at international level.

Career
Born in Nice, France, Randriambololona has played for Sedan B, Auxerre B, Excelsior Virton, Antwerp and Roeselare. In January 2019, he moved to FC Fleury 91. In October 2021, he moved to Moldovan club Bălți.

He made his international debut for Madagascar in 2015.

References

1994 births
Living people
People with acquired Malagasy citizenship
Malagasy footballers
Madagascar international footballers
French footballers
French sportspeople of Malagasy descent
Footballers from Nice
CS Sedan Ardennes players
AJ Auxerre players
R.E. Virton players
Royal Antwerp F.C. players
K.S.V. Roeselare players
FC Fleury 91 players
Belgian Pro League players
Championnat National 3 players
Challenger Pro League players
Belgian Third Division players
Moldovan Super Liga players
Association football wingers
French expatriate footballers
French expatriate sportspeople in Belgium
French expatriate sportspeople in Moldova
Malagasy expatriate footballers
Malagasy expatriate sportspeople in Belgium
Malagasy expatriate sportspeople in Moldova
Expatriate footballers in Belgium
Expatriate footballers in Moldova
CSF Bălți players